The Kansas City Phantoms were a professional indoor American football team based in Independence, Missouri. The Phantoms competed in Champions Indoor Football (CIF) as a member of the league's North Conference. The team was founded in 2016 by Dr. Ken Vehec and Antonio Hori. The Phantoms joined the CIF as an expansion team in 2017. The Phantoms played their home games at the Silverstein Eye Centers Arena for both seasons.

History
On October 17, 2016, the Phantoms were announced as an expansion member of Champions Indoor Football. On October 26, 2016, former indoor football quarterback, Chris Coffin was named the head coach of the Phantoms. The Phantoms finished their first season 4–8. On August 10, 2017, the Phantoms announced that Coffin would not return as the head coach.

For the 2018 season, the Phantoms hired Meadow Lemon as head coach. The team finished 3–9 and again failed to make the playoffs. The team was not listed as a member of the CIF when the 2019 schedule was released.

Roster

Statistics

Season-by-season results
As of the 2018 season:

Head coaches' records
As of the 2018 CIF season:

References

External links
 Official site

American football teams in Missouri
Champions Indoor Football teams
American football teams established in 2016
Independence, Missouri
Sports in the Kansas City metropolitan area
2016 establishments in Missouri